The men's 110 metres hurdles event at the 1989 Summer Universiade was held at the Wedaustadion in Duisburg on 29 and 30 August 1989.

Medalists

Results

Heats
Held on 29 August

Wind:Heat 1: 0.0 m/s, Heat 2: +1.1 m/s, Heat 3: +1.3 m/s, Heat 4: +0.3 m/s, Heat 5: 0.0 m/s

Semifinals
Held on 29 August

Wind:Heat 1: +0.6 m/s, Heat 2: +0.6 m/s

Final
Held on 30 August

Wind: -1.4 m/s

References

Athletics at the 1989 Summer Universiade
1989